This is a list of transfers in Serbian football for the 2016–17 winter transfer window.
 Moves featuring Serbian SuperLiga and Serbian First League sides are listed.
 The order by which the clubs are listed is equal to the classification at the mid-season of the 2016–17 Serbian SuperLiga and 2016–17 Serbian First League.

Serbian SuperLiga

Red Star Belgrade

In:

Out:

Partizan

In:

Out:

Vojvodina

In:

Out:

Napredak Kruševac

In:

Out:

Mladost Lučani

In:

Out:

Javor Ivanjica

In:

Out:

Radnički Niš

In:

Out:

Spartak Subotica

In:

Out:

Voždovac

In:

Out:

Rad

In:

Out:

Metalac G. M.

In:

Out:

Čukarički

In:

Out:

Radnik Surdulica

In:

Out:

Bačka BP

In:

Out:

Borac Čačak

In:

Out:

Novi Pazar

In:

Out:

Serbian First League

Mačva Šabac

In:

Out:

Sloboda Užice

In:

Out:

Radnički Pirot

In:

Out:

ČSK Čelarevo

In:

Out:

Proleter Novi Sad

In:

Out:

Zemun

In:

Out:

Budućnost Dobanovci

In:

Out:

Inđija

In:

Out:

Sinđelić Beograd

In:

Out:

Bežanija

In:

Out:

BSK Borča

In:

Out:

Dinamo Vranje

In:

Out:

Jagodina

In:

Out:

Kolubara

In:

Out:

OFK Odžaci

In:

Out:

OFK Beograd

In:

Out:

See also
Serbian SuperLiga
2016–17 Serbian SuperLiga
Serbian First League
2016–17 Serbian First League

References

Serbian SuperLiga
2016–17
transfers